Meinrad Belle (1943-2015) was a German politician (CDU) and former member of the German Bundestag.

Life 
From 1975 to 1990 he was mayor of the community of Brigachtal in the Schwarzwald-Baar district and from 1990 to 2002 member of the German Bundestag.

References 

1943 births
2015 deaths
Members of the Bundestag for Baden-Württemberg
Members of the Bundestag 1998–2002
Members of the Bundestag 1994–1998
Members of the Bundestag 1990–1994
Members of the Bundestag for the Christian Democratic Union of Germany